The 1966 Cardiff City Council election was held on Thursday 12 May 1966 to elect councillors to Cardiff City Council in Cardiff, Glamorgan, Wales. It took place on the same day as several other county borough elections in Wales and England.

The previous elections to this one were in May 1965 and the next elections would be in May 1967.

The election saw the Labour Party lose control of the council to the Conservatives.

Background
Cardiff County Borough Council had been created in 1889. Cardiff became a city in 1905. Elections to the local authority were held annually, though not all council seats were included in each contest, because each of the three councillors in each ward stood down for election in rotation.

The council also included aldermen who were elected for a six-year period by the councillors.

At the 1965 Cardiff election the Conservatives had won seven seats from Labour and the Liberal Party, leaving Labour in control of the City Council as a result of the Lord Mayor's casting vote.

Overview of the result

Seventeen seats in 17 electoral wards were up for election in May 1966. All seats were contested by Labour and the Conservatives, three seats were contested by the Liberals, Independents stood in Grangetown and Gabalfa (where the Tories had won seats in 1965) and a sole Plaid Cymru candidate stood in Splott.

In Grangetown, the sitting Labour councillor Maxwell Christie was deselected by the Cardiff Labour Party, but stood as an Independent Labour candidate.

The Conservatives won two seats from Labour, in Grangetown and Canton, giving them a majority on the Council.

Council composition
Prior to the election the council had been divided with 34 seats held by Labour and 34 by the Conservatives. By dint of winning two seats, the Conservatives now had a majority of 36 to 32.

Ward results
Contests took place in every ward at this election.

Adamsdown

Canton

Cathays

Central

Ely

Gabalfa

Grangetown

Councillor Maxwell Christie was deselected by the Cardiff Labour Party, but stood as an Independent Labour candidate. He had been a Grangetown councillor since 1962. The local Labour Party threatened to expel him and his two main supporters.

Llandaff

Llanishen

Penylan

Plasmawr

Plasnewydd

Riverside

Roath

Rumney

South

Splott

* = 'retiring' ward councillor for re-election

References

Council elections in Cardiff
1960s in Cardiff
1966 Welsh local elections